European route E 136 is a European highway located entirely in Møre og Romsdal and Innlandet counties in Norway. The highway begins in the town of Ålesund in Møre og Romsdal county on the west coast of Norway, and it goes east up through the Romsdalen valley, crossing into the upper Gudbrandsdalen Valley to end at the village of Dombås in Dovre Municipality in Innlandet county.

Møre og Romsdal county

Ålesund municipality 
 Ålesund, to Ålesund Airport, Vigra
 at Spjelkavik (jointly with E136 until Vestnes in Vestnes Municipality)
 Sørnes Tunnel (236 m)
 Brusdal
 Sjøholt

Vestnes municipality 
 at Vestnes (jointly with E136 from Spjelkavika in Ålesund)
 Tresfjord Bridge over the Tresfjorden

Rauma municipality 
 Vågstrand Tunnel (3,665 m)
 Måndal Tunnel (2,080 m)
 Innfjord Tunnel (6,594 m)
 Rauma Bridge over the Rauma River (140 m)
 Åndalsnes
 Sogge Bridge at Åndalsnes

Innlandet county

Lesja municipality 
 at Lesja

Dovre municipality 
 at Dombås

References

External links 
 UN Economic Commission for Europe: Overall Map of E-road Network (2007)

199136
E136
E136
E136